is a railway station on the Keisei Oshiage Line in Sumida, Tokyo, Japan, operated by the private railway operator Keisei Electric Railway.

Lines

Station layout
This station consists of two side platforms serving two tracks.

Platforms

History
The station opened on 3 November 1912, initially named . It was renamed Keisei Hikifune on 18 November 1931.

Station numbering was introduced to all Keisei Line stations on 17 July 2010; Keisei Hikifune was assigned station number KS46.

Surrounding area
 Mukōjima-Hyakkaen Garden

See also
 List of railway stations in Japan

References

External links

  

Railway stations in Tokyo
Railway stations in Japan opened in 1912